agru Kunststofftechnik Gesellschaft m.b.H. is a company with global operations in engineering plastics based in Bad Hall, Austria, and was founded in 1948 by Alois Gruber senior. AGRU manufactures and supplies pipeline systems, semi-finished products, concrete protection liners, and geomembranes made of engineered plastics. As one of the 130 largest industrial companies in Austria, and one of Upper Austrias' TOP 50 biggest Companies, AGRU employs 1020 staff and has global sales of EUR 375 million (2017). 
In addition to the five factories at the global headquarters in Bad Hall, the company operates production sites in the United States, Germany, Poland and China. The export share is over 90%. Sales partners in more than 150 countries distribute products from AGRU, for which approximately 100,000 tons of plastic are processed annually.

Company history

Beginnings 

In 1948, Alois Gruber senior founded a locksmith business in Bad Hall and an anodizing plant in Grünburg. In the 1950s, the locksmith business was dissolved to focus on anodizing, which was expanded by a powder coating and a wet paint shop. This knowledge is summarized today in AGRU Oberflächentechnik GmbH, in Grünburg, Upper Austria. AGRU Oberflächentechnik GmbH operates independently from agru Kunststofftechnik Gesellschaft m.b.H., but is under the same management.

Plastic technology 

In 1961, Alois Gruber senior laid the foundations of AGRU's future in engineered plastics with the decision to begin production of plastic pipes. In the following years, production was expanded. First, with the introduction of polypropylene and polyethylene pipes, and later with the production of fittings, plates, bars, and welding rods made of different engineered plastics. Pipes with different diameters are the main part of production. The pipes can also be installed trenchless. For a project in Germany, AGRULINE large diameter pipes with OD 1400 mm were installed for the first time with the horizontal directional drilling method.

Injection moulding 

By 1966, AGRU's first injection molding machines were in operation producing fittings for pipeline construction, making AGRU one of the first manufacturers in Europe to supply pipes and fittings from their own production facilities. The productivity gain during manufacturing was significant. Up to this point, fittings were segmented and required pipes to be welded together. In contrast, injection-moulded plastic fittings have no weld seams inside (seams serve as a braking mechanism for flowing media), creating superior flow characteristics in the complete pipeline system. Finally, by producing the pipes from one mould pressure resistance can be increased.

Internationalization 

In 1988, AGRU established its first production location outside of Austria in Boston, Massachusetts. This marked the beginning of the international expansion of the family business. Then, in 1991, AGRU-FRANK GmbH was founded in Wölfersheim, Germany in cooperation with the German sales partner FRANK GmbH. In 1996, AGRU America moved its United States’ production site from Boston to Georgetown, South Carolina.
.

Further development 

In 1997, AGRU started the production of electro-socket fittings. This was done by taking heating wire, the electro socket, and pouring or plastering it into specially designed fittings.

Company expansion 

In 1998, Alois Gruber, the son of the company founder, began managing the AGRU business. The headquarters location in Bad Hall was expanded for the first time since its founding. And after the turn of the millennium, AGRU set up plant III and IV at the headquarters. In addition, AGRU expanded its international production sites as joint ventures in Poland, China, and the United States. With these new production sites, AGRU could begin producing large-diameter pipes of up to 2,500 mm in 2012.
In 2016, AGRU constructed plant V, an ISO class 5 clean-room production facility, setting a new industry standard for the production of pipe systems for ultrapure media applications. The new pipes are now distributed under the PURAD brand and are designed for high-tech applications where purity, leaching performance, and chemical resistance are prerequisites. Application areas include microelectronics, life science and the food industry as well as ultrapure water systems in different sectors.

Product categories 

AGRU manufactures pipe systems for various applications, semi-finished products, concrete protection liners as well as geomembranes for landfill and tunnel construction from high-quality plastics. The company supplies industries such as the water and gas industry, the energy industry, the chemical and heavy industries, the semiconductor and pharmaceutical industries, containers and shipbuilding, mining, and civil engineering. The products are divided into the seven product groups AGRULINE, INDUSTRY, PURAD, CONCRETE PROTECTION, SEMI-FINISHED, AGRUSAN & AGRUAIR and LINING SYSTEMS.

Production sites 
The family business agru Kunststofftechnik Gesellschaft m.b.H. has eight production sites in five countries. In some cases these are managed as joint ventures.

Austria
 agru Kunststofftechnik Gesellschaft m.b.H., Bad Hall
 agru Oberflächentechnik Gesellschaft m.b.H., Waldneukirchen
Germany
 AGRU-Frank GmbH, Wölfersheim
United States
 AGRU America Inc., Georgetown/South Carolina
 AGRU America Inc., Fernley/Nevada
 AGRU America Inc., Andrews/South Carolina
Poland
 TWS Thermoplastic Winding Systems, Lozienica
China
 Taicang AGRU Plastics Co., Taicang

References

External links
 AGRU Kunststofftechnik

Austrian brands
Manufacturing companies of Austria
Manufacturing companies established in 1948
Austrian companies established in 1948
Economy of Upper Austria